Lifan Industry (Group) Co., Ltd. (Lifan Group or Lifan, lit. "Power Sail") is a civilian owned Chinese motorcycle and automobile manufacturer headquartered in Chongqing, China. It was founded in 1992 and began to manufacture automobiles in 2005, with license-built microvans and a small sedan developed by Lifan.

Lifan's vehicle products include passenger cars, microvans, dirt bike engines, entry-level motorcycles, mini-vehicles, and commercial trucks. The company's non-vehicle-related activities include the manufacture of sports shoes and winemaking. Outside of China, Lifan is currently best known for the sale of small passenger cars in emerging markets. Lifan's KPR bikes have won the (CRRC) China Road Racing Championship 17 times. Lifan is one of the major manufacturer of the Predator engine.

History

Lifan was founded by former political dissident Yin Mingshan in 1992 as a motorcycle repair shop with a staff of nine. Mingshan has a long history of conflict with government authority but currently enjoys a positive relationship with the Chinese Communist Party. The company was originally called "Chongqing Hongda Auto Fittings Research Centre". The company was renamed Lifan Industry Group in 1997. It expanded into building buses in 2003. As of 2004, Lifan was being referred to as "the largest private motorcycle manufacturer in China." In 2009, it as the fifth-largest Chinese motorcycle maker.

In 2003, Lifan acquired Chongqing Special Purpose Use Vehicle Manufacturing Co Ltd, and 2005 saw the start of automobile production beginning with the LF6361/1010 minivan and pickup based on the 1999 Daihatsu Atrai. In December 2005, Lifan's first independently developed car entered production, the 520 sedan with a Brazilian Tritec engine. As of 2011, Lifan makes a number of consumer offerings including the subcompact 320, the compact sedan and hatchback 520, the mid-sized 620 sedan, and the X60 compact SUV.

Lifan made an IPO on the Shanghai Stock Exchange in late-2010. In 2011, Lifan's exchange-listed entity announced revenue of US$1.83 billion, and profits of US$62 million.

Lifan entered into an agreement with Italian motorcycle manufacturer MV Agusta on July 4, 2014, to be MV Agusta's sole distributors in China. Lifan currently have a number of Agusta models on show at selected dealerships, including the F4 RR motorcycle.

Founder Yin Mingshan and his family are worth US$1.3 billion as of 2014.

Lifan's cash balance was 370 million yuan versus 3.1 billion yuan at the end of 2017. Lifan had only 450 million yuan out of 12.6 billion yuan worth of credit lines from 25 banks according to filings. In 2018, Lifan raised approximately 4 billion yuan selling land to the government and unit Lifan Motors to electric vehicle startup Li Auto.

As of 2020, it was reported that Lifan's debt totaled 31 billion yuan ($4.4 billion) in June 2019, with 60% due within a year, while assets stood at 41.5 billion yuan according to company filings. News of Geely planning to takeover Lifan surfaced with the target being the market share in the southwest which Lifan mainly dominates.

Trademark dispute with Honda Motor
In 2004, Lifan was ordered to cease selling motorcycles under the brand name "Hongda"—the culmination of a successful lawsuit brought by Honda Motors. That same year Honda initiated a separate suit against Lifan this time for using badges similar to Honda's on its motorcycle products.

Geely acquisition
On December 13, 2021, Geely Automobile announced that Geely intends to jointly invest in the establishment of a joint venture company with Lifan Technology. The registered capital of the target company is 600 million yuan RMB. Geely Holding and Lifan Technology will each invest 300 million yuan, each holding 50% of the shares. In other words, in the total shares of Lifan Technology, Geely will account for 34.7%, making Geely the controlling shareholder of the firm. The joint venture manufactures electric vehicles using Geely's existing platforms under the Maple brand. As of January 2022, Geely announced that the joint venture with Lifan plans to build a battery swap ecosystem for electric cars. The first compatible car was launched in February 2021 as the Maple 60S.

Products

Motorcycles

Current and former Lifan motorcycle products include:
 Lifan LF150-10S (KPR150) - Small-displacement street motorcycle.
 Lifan LF250GY-2 Cossack - Dual-sport motorcycle that utilises a cooling system of oil pumped through its frame.
 Lifan LF400 (399cc) - looks Similarly To a Harley but much slower or a Yamaha Virago XV535.
 Lifan LF150-10B (KP150) - Smaller, less powerful version of the KPR150 street motorcycle.
 Lifan KPR 200 - The Most Powerful Version in The KPR series
 Lifan LF100-C(II) - (PONY 100II) - Mini street bike.
 Lifan LF150-5U (KPmini 150) - Mini street motorcycle, competitor to the Honda Grom and Kawasaki Z125
 Lifan X-Pect 200cc - an entry-level, dual-purpose motorcycle
 Lifan KPX 250 - Fuel injected, 6 speed, intermediate dual-sport motorcycle (Introduced in 2022)

Automobiles
Current and former Lifan automobile products include:
 Lifan LF6361/1010 - this small minivan and pickup is based on the 1999 Daihatsu Atrai, but has since been replaced
 Lifan 320 - a small hatchback, famous for being a fairly straightforward copy of the current Mini.
 Lifan 330
 Lifan 520 - built since 2005, this subcompact sedan was Lifan's first original development.
 Lifan 520i - the hatchback version of the subcompact 520, with its own bodywork
 Lifan 530
 Lifan 620 - a compact sedan
 Lifan 630
 Lifan 650
 Lifan 720
 Lifan 820
 Lifan Lotto
 Lifan Xuanlang (M7)
 Lifan X50
 Lifan X60 - Lifan's first SUV
 Lifan Maiwei
 Lifan X70
 Lifan X80
 Lifan Foison - introduced in 2011, this minivan range is based on the earlier LF6361 series.
 Lifan Mini Truck LF1022 - a truck version of the Foison
 Lifan Light Truck model LF1025D
 Lifan Xingshun
 Lifan Fushun

Gallery

Operations

Production facilities
Lifan has two passenger-car assembly plants in China.

Now boasting motorcycle production bases in Thailand, Iran, Turkey, and Vietnam, Lifan first established a presence in Vietnam in 1999 that made motorcycles and parts. Beginning in March 2007, assembly of the 520 sedan commenced in Vietnam. By mid-2009, the 320, 520i, and 620 had also been built or assembled in this country.

Overseas assembly factories make Lifan-branded automobiles sold to domestic audiences but are not necessarily affiliated with Lifan in any way.

Azerbaijan
In early 2010, Lifan established an automobile assembly factory in Azerbaijan.

Egypt
Such assembly has occurred in Egypt.

Ethiopia
From 2007 until 2010, the Lifan 520 was assembled in Ethiopia from imported knock-down kits under the name of "Abay" (Amharic for the Blue Nile) by Holland Car Company. Cars assembled in Ethiopia may now bear the Lifan name, and an after sales service center for Lifan automobiles exists in the capital, Addis Ababa, as of 2010. As of 2016, Lifan continues to produce in Ethiopia (perhaps without a local partner), assembling cars with native-born labor from knock-down kits. Five different models can be made at the current facility, set up in 2014, and sales can total fifty cars a month at prices ranging from $15,000 to $30,000.

Iran
Lifan was assembling cars in Iran around 2010.

Russia
Assembly of automobiles in Russia began in August 2007, and in early 2011, the 320 model became the third Lifan product to see local production.

Uruguay
In 2010, a 40,000 units/year production capacity assembly plant was established in Uruguay.

Research and development
At the end of 2006, Lifan held over 3,800 patents, the largest number of any Chinese automobile company, of which at least 346 of were held by Lifan's automobile division.

Sales

Access to profitable export markets, something the Chinese State allowed the company in 1998, means that this maker of automobiles and motorcycles does what many Chinese automakers desire: it sells in developed overseas markets like the EU, Singapore and Japan.

While finding more markets for its motorcycle-related products, Lifan has exported passenger cars to 51 countries. In 2010, its automotive exports were rivaled by only Chery. The company has sold in many countries and in every continent except Antarctica.

Allowed access in 2003, Lifan motorcycle products are sold in 18 European countries. The Italian importer Martin Motors rebadges and sells two small Lifan passenger car models under its own name.

Lifan has sold motorcycles in Japan since 2001. Lifan automobiles have been sold in Laos and Syria since 2009.

Lifan motorcycles and dirt bikes are available in Canada and Mexico. As of 2009, a single model was on offer in this country.

Some small passenger car models are sold in Brazil, Guatemala, Peru, and Uruguay.

Some of the cars Lifan exports are in the form of knock-down kits. Put together in small, local workshops, selling such kits is an easy way for the company to gain access to developing markets.

Sponsorships
Lifan was formerly the owner of the Chinese super league football team Chongqing Lifan; since 2005 it has been a sponsor of the team.

References

External links

Official Website

 
Motorcycle manufacturers of China
Electric vehicle manufacturers of China
Vehicle manufacturing companies established in 1992
1992 establishments in China
Chinese brands
Civilian-run enterprises of China